Truth, Justice, and the American Way may refer to:

 Truth, Justice, and the American Way, a catch-phrase of the comic-book character Superman.
What's So Funny About Truth, Justice & the American Way?, a comic book published by DC Comics in 2001
Truth, Justice, and the American Way, the original title of the 2006 feature film Hollywoodland
 "Truth, Justice and the American Way" (Supergirl), an episode of the TV series Supergirl (2016)
 "What's So Funny About Truth, Justice, and the American Way?", an episode of the TV series Supergirl (2019)